Golis Telecom Somalia, shortened to Golis, is the largest telecommunications operator in the Puntland state of northeastern Somalia. It was founded in 2002 with the objective of supplying the country with GSM mobile services, fixed line and internet services. The firm has an extensive network that covers all the major cities and more than 50 districts in Puntland and neighbouring Somaliland.

The company has its headquarters in the port city and the commercial capital of Puntland , Bosaso. Golis Telecom has also centers in the main cities and towns of Puntland such as Qardho, Garowe, Hadaaftimo, Burtinle, Galkacyo , Dhahar, Carmo, Baran, Goldogob Hingalol and Bo’ame, Lasanod as well as Erigavo.

Other services
Golis Mobile offers other services such as XOGMAAL. XOGMAAL enables enquiring, emailing through the mobile, and searching the online encyclopedias and dictionaries as well as search engines such as Google. It also allows online checking of stocks, currency rate exchange and weather forecasts. Additionally, the service offers access to local Somali media, as well as international news channels like the BBC, Al-Jazeera and CNN. According to The Economist, in 2005, Somali offered some of the cheapest mobile calling rates in Africa.

In August 2011, the Salaam Bank also launched an independent (Kaaftoon) service partnering the institution with Golis Telecom Somalia.

See also
Hormuud Telecom
Telesom company
Somali Telecom Group
Netco (Somalia)
Somafone

References

External links
 

Telecommunications companies of Somalia
Telecommunications companies established in 2002
Privately held companies
Bosaso
Organisations based in Puntland
2002 establishments in Somalia